Avondale   is a community in the Canadian province of Nova Scotia, located in  Pictou County .

References
Avondale  on Destination Nova Scotia

Communities in Pictou County